Sir Joseph Dobbie (1862 – 18 May 1943) was a British Liberal Party politician.

Background
He was a son of James Dobbie. He was educated at the Ayr Academy and the University of Edinburgh

Career
He was a Liberal in favour of social reform. He gained a parliamentary seat from the Unionists at the Ayr Burghs by-election of 1904; 

He sat as Liberal MP for Ayr Burghs from 1904 to 1906, but lost the seat back to the Unionist at the January 1906 general election; 

He was a Member of the Departmental Committee on Housing in 1908. He was Chairman of the Royal Scots Recruiting Committee from 1914 to 1916. He attempted a return to parliament after a 12-year break, without success, when he contested Edinburgh Central at the 1918 general election; 

He did not stand for parliament again. Dobbie was knighted in the 1920 Birthday Honours for public and local services in Edinburgh. He was Head of Dalgleish, Dobbie & Co., SSC, Edinburgh. He was a Justice of the Peace in the City of Edinburgh. He was a Legal Member of the Edinburgh Military Tribunal. He was President of the Scottish Vernacular Association.

Sources
Who Was Who
British parliamentary election results 1885–1918, Craig, F. W. S.

References

External links 
 
Who Was Who; http://www.ukwhoswho.com

1862 births
1943 deaths
Scottish Liberal Party MPs
Members of the Parliament of the United Kingdom for Scottish constituencies
UK MPs 1900–1906
Knights Bachelor